Over the history of the Serbian Orthodox Church, the church has had many people who were venerated to sainthood.  The list below contains some of those saints and their feast days.

Venerable Avakum (Deacon Avakum) – 
Venerable Anastasia of Serbia (Ana Nemanjić) – 
Venerable Angelina of Serbia (Angelina Branković) –  and 
Saint Arsenije I Sremac – 
Hieromartyr Branko Dobrosavljević – 
Saint Basil of Ostrog – 
Venerable Visarion Saraj – 
Saint Vladislav (King Stefan Vladislav) –  and 
Martyr Vukašin of Klepci (Vukašin Mandrapa) – 
Venerable Gabriel of Lesnovo – 
Saint St. Gavrilo Rajić – 
Hieromartyr Georgije (Đorđe) Bogić – 
Venerable Grigorije of Gornjak – 
Saint Grigorije or Bishop Grigorije II of Ras – 
Venerable David (Dmitar Nemanjić) – 
Saint Danilo II (Archbishop Danilo II of Serbia) – 
Confessor Dositej Vasić (Metropolitan Bishop of Zagreb) – 
Saint New Martyr Đorđe Kratovac –   and 
Saint Jakov (Archbishop Jakov of Serbia) –  
Saints and Martyrs of Jasenovac- 
Saint Jevstatije I – 
Saint Jevstatije II – 
Venerable Jelena of Dečani (Anna Neda of Serbia) – 
Saint Jelena (Helen of Anjou) – 
Venerable Jelisaveta (Princess Jelena Štiljanović) – 
Saint  Jefrem (Jefrem) – 
Venerable Jefrosinija (Jevgenija) (Princess Milica of Serbia) – 
Venerable Jeftimije of Dečani – 
Venerable Joachim of Osogovo – 
Venerable Joanikije of Devič – 
Saint Joanikije (Patriarch Joanikije II of Serbia) – 
Hieromartyr Joanikije Lipovac (Metropolitan Bishop of Montenegro and the Littoral) – 
Venerable Joasaph of Meteora – 
Saint Jovan Vladimir (King of Duklja) – 
Saint Jovan the New (Despot Jovan Branković) – 
Saint Josif the New – 
Saint Kirilo (Kirilo I, Serbian Patriarch) – 
Saint Great Martyr Lazar (Prince Lazar of Serbia) – 
Saint Makarije (Patriarch Makarije Sokolović) – 
Saint Maksim (Despot Đorđe Branković) – 
Saint King Milutin (Stephen Uroš II Milutin of Serbia) – 
Venerable Nestor of Dečani – 
Saint Nikodim (Archbishop Nikodim I of Peć) – 
Venerable Nicodemus of Tismana (Nikodim Grčić) – 
Saint Nikon (Patriarch Nikon of Serbia) – 
Saint Nikolaj Velimirović of Ohrid and Žiča-
Hieromartyr Petar Zimonjić (Metropolitan Bishop of Dabar-Bosnia) – 
Saint Petar of Koriša – , see: Peter of Koriša
Saint Peter of Cetinje, the Wonderworker (Petar I Petrović-Njegoš) – 
Hieromartyr Platon Jovanović (Bishop of Banja Luka) – 
Venerable Prohor of Pčinja – , see: Prohor Pčinjski
Venerable Rafailo Banatski or Rafilo of Banat- 
Hieromartyr Rafailo Momčilović (Prior of Šišatovac monastery) – 
Saint Sava I (First Archbishop of Serbia) – 
Saint Sava II (Archbishop of Serbia) – 
Saint Sava II Branković (Metropolitan Bishop of Erdély) – 
Saint Sava III (Archbishop of Serbia) – 
Hieromartyr Sava Trlajić (Bishop of Upper Karlovac) or New Martyr- 
Saint Simeon the Myrrh-streaming (Grand Prince Stefan Nemanja) – 
Venerable Simeon the Monk (King Stefan the First-Crowned) – 
Venerable Sinaites: Romylos of Ravanica, Roman, Nestor, Martirije, Sisoje, Zosim of Tuman and Jov – 
Saint Spiridon (Serbian Patriarch) – 
Saint Stefan of Dečani (King Stefan Uroš III) – 
Saint Stefan Lazarević (Despot Stefan) – 
Venerable Stephen of Piperi –  
Saint Stefan the Blind (Despot Stefan Branković) – 
Saint Stefan Uroš (Stefan Uroš V) – 
Saint Stefan Urošic Nemanjić – 
Saint Stefan Štiljanović – 
Hieromartyr Teodor Nestorović (Bishop of Vršac) – 
Holy Martyr Teodor (Sladić) of Komogovo – Theodore's sathurday, first Saturday of Great Lent
Venerable Teoktist (Stephen Dragutin of Serbia) –

References
 Svetosavlje: СРБИ СВЕТИТЕЉИ (Serbian Saints) 

 
Saints
Saints
Saints